Myelobia parnahyba is a moth in the family Crambidae. It was described by Schaus in 1934. It is found in Brazil (Rio de Janeiro).

References

Chiloini
Moths described in 1934